Miss Costa Rica is a national beauty pageant in Costa Rica. The winner of the pageant represents Costa Rica at Miss Universe pageant.

History
Women between the ages of 18 and 27, each representing a province, compete to represent Costa Rica for one year and participate in the annual Miss Universe international competition.

Costa Rica has participated in the Miss Universe pageant since 1954 and has sent 56 representatives in the pageant's 60-year history. The event has been broadcast by Teletica since 1960.

In 2007 Costa Rica's representatives in Miss World, Miss International and Miss Earth are selected by Reinas de Costa Rica Organization.

In 2017 The Miss Costa Rica Crown was awarded to the previous year's First Runner-up, Elena Correa, without an official contest ceremony.

Titleholders

See also
Reinas de Costa Rica

References

External links
Official Miss Costa Rica website

Costa Rica
Costa Rica
Recurring events established in 1954
Costa Rican awards